The Sioux Chief PowerPEX 200 is an ARCA Menards Series race held annually at Memphis International Raceway in Millington, Tennessee. It serves as the finale of the Sioux Chief Short Track Showdown, and was formerly sanctioned by the NASCAR K&N Pro Series East.

History
2017 was the first year that the NASCAR K&N Pro Series East raced at Memphis International Raceway. After spending three years under the K&N East banner, the race was sanctioned by the ARCA Menards Series for the first time in 2020.

Past winners

References

External links
 http://hometracks.nascar.com/tracks/memphis Memphis at NASCAR Home Tracks
 Racing-Reference.info – Memphis at Racing-Reference

ARCA Menards Series East
NASCAR races at Memphis International Raceway
2017 establishments in Tennessee
Recurring sporting events established in 2017
ARCA Menards Series races